Andrea Fischbacher (born 14 October 1985) is a retired alpine ski racer from Austria.

Career
Born in Schwarzach im Pongau, Salzburg, Fischbacher now lives in Eben im Pongau. She made her World Cup debut in March 2004 in Sestriere, Italy, where she would claim her first World Cup victory four years later, a dead-heat tie with Fabienne Suter. Fischbacher competed for Austria at the Winter Olympics in 2006 and again in 2010, where she won the gold medal in the Super-G, ahead of Tina Maze and Lindsey Vonn. In the Downhill on February 17, she finished 4th, missing the bronze medal by 0.03 seconds.

Left off the Austrian team for the 2014 Winter Olympics, Fischbacher responded with a victory in the first race after the games, her first World Cup podium in over four years.

World Cup results

Race podiums
3 wins – (2 DH, 1 SG)
10 podiums – (3 DH, 6 SG, 1 GS) 

^ Tie for first with Fabienne Suter.

Season standings

World Championship results

Olympic results

Personal
Fischbacher is a second cousin of Hermann Maier, a multiple Olympic, World Cup, and world champion.

References

External links
 
 
  
 Austrian Ski team – official site – Andrea Fischbacher – 

1985 births
Austrian female alpine skiers
Alpine skiers at the 2006 Winter Olympics
Alpine skiers at the 2010 Winter Olympics
Olympic alpine skiers of Austria
Medalists at the 2010 Winter Olympics
Olympic medalists in alpine skiing
Olympic gold medalists for Austria
People from St. Johann im Pongau District
Living people
Sportspeople from Salzburg (state)